Baden-Württemberg (F222) is the lead ship of the s of the German Navy.

Background 
Baden-Württemberg was designed and constructed by ARGE F125, a joint-venture of Thyssen-Krupp and Lürssen.

Construction and career
Baden-Württemberg was laid down on 2 November 2011 and launched on 12 December 2013 in Hamburg, Germany. She was commissioned on 17 June 2019.

On 17 April 2020, Baden-Württemberg completed her extreme weather test in the South Atlantic after she left Brazil on 7 February to test hot weather near the Equator.

In January 2022, it was reported that full operational capability for Baden-Württemberg was still only expected in mid-2023.

Gallery

References

External links 
 Seaforces.org

Baden-Württemberg-class frigates
2013 ships
Ships built in Hamburg